The Bächlistock is a mountain of the Bernese Alps, overlooking the Unteraar Glacier in the canton of Bern. Its summit has an elevation of 3,247 metres above sea level and is the tripoint between the glacier valleys of Hiendertelltigletscher, Bächligletscher and Unteraar.

References

External links
Bächlistock on Hikr

Mountains of the Alps
Mountains of the canton of Bern
Alpine three-thousanders
Bernese Alps
Mountains of Switzerland